The Armenian shrew (Crocidura armenica) is a species of mammal in the family Soricidae. It is endemic to Armenia.

Sources

Mammals of Europe
Crocidura
Endemic fauna of Armenia
Mammals described in 1963
Taxonomy articles created by Polbot